The Chesapeake and Ohio Canal, abbreviated as the C&O Canal and occasionally called the "Grand Old Ditch", operated from 1831 until 1924 along the Potomac River between Washington, D.C. and Cumberland, Maryland. It replaced the Potomac Canal, which shut down completely in 1828, and could operate during months in which the water level was too low for the former canal. The canal's principal cargo was coal from the Allegheny Mountains.

Construction on the  canal began in 1828 and ended in 1850 with the completion of a  stretch to Cumberland, although the Baltimore and Ohio Railroad had already reached Cumberland in 1842. A planned section to the Ohio River at Pittsburgh was never built.

The canalway is now maintained as the Chesapeake and Ohio Canal National Historical Park, with a trail that follows the old towpath.

History

Early river projects
After the American Revolutionary War, George Washington was the chief advocate of using waterways to connect the Eastern Seaboard to the Great Lakes and the Ohio River, which flows into the Mississippi River and ultimately to the Gulf of Mexico at New Orleans. In 1785, Washington founded the Potowmack Company to improve the navigability of the Potomac River. His company built five skirting canals around the major falls: Little Falls (later incorporated in the C&O Canal), Great Falls in Virginia, Seneca Falls (opposite Violette's lock), Payne's Falls of the Shenandoah, and House's Falls near Harpers Ferry. These canals allowed an easy downstream float; upstream journeys, propelled by pole, were harder.

Several kinds of watercraft were used on the Patowmack Canal and in the Potomac River. Gondolas were  log rafts, usually sold at journey's end for their wood by their owners, who returned upstream on foot. Sharpers were flat-bottomed boats, usable only on high-water days, about 45 days per year.

Construction

Planning

The Erie Canal, built between 1817 and 1825, threatened traders south of New York City, who began to seek their own transportation infrastructure to link the burgeoning areas west of the Appalachian Mountains to mid-Atlantic markets and ports. As early as 1820, plans were being laid for a canal to link the Ohio River and Chesapeake Bay.

In early March 1825, President James Monroe signed the bill chartering the construction of the C&O Canal as one of the last acts of his presidency. The plan was to build it in two sections, the eastern section from the tidewater of Washington, D.C., to Cumberland, Maryland; and the western section over the Allegheny Mountains to the Ohio River or one of its tributaries. Free from taxation, the canal company was required to have  in use in five years, and to complete the canal in 12 years. The canal was engineered to have a  water current, supplying the canal and assisting mules pulling boats downstream.

The eastern section was the only part to be completed.

On October 23, 1826, the engineers submitted the study, presenting the proposed canal route in three sections. The eastern section comprised Georgetown to Cumberland; the middle section, Cumberland (going up Wills Creek to Hyndman then across the Sand Patch Grade crossing the Eastern Continental Divide to Garrett) to the confluence of the Casselman River and the Youghiogheny River; and the western section from there to Pittsburgh.

The total estimated price tag, more than $22 million, dampened the enthusiasm of many supporters, who were expecting more like $4 million to $5 million. At a convention in December 1826, they attempted to discredit the engineers' report, and offered lower estimates: Georgetown to Cumberland, $5,273,283; Georgetown to Pittsburgh, $13,768,152. Geddes and Roberts were hired to make another report, which they gave in 1828: $4,479,346.93 for Georgetown to Cumberland. With those numbers to encourage them, the stockholders formally organized the Chesapeake and Ohio Canal Company in June 1828. In the end, the final construction cost to Cumberland in 1850 was $11,071,075.21. Compared to the original cost given by the engineers in 1826 of about $8 million, removing things not in the estimate such as land purchases, engineering expenses, incidental damages, salaries, and fencing provision, the cost overrun was about 19%, which can be justified by the inflation rate of the period. The cost overrun of the other proposal (Geddes and Roberts) was about 51% thus showing that the original engineer's estimate was good.

In 1824, the holdings of the Patowmack Company were ceded to the Chesapeake and Ohio Company. (Rejected names for the canal included the "Potomac Canal" and "Union Canal".) By 1825, the Canal Company was authorized by an act of the General Assembly of Maryland in the amount of subscriptions of $500,000; this paved the way for future investments and loans. According to historians, those financial resources were expended until the State had prostrated itself on its own credit.

Groundbreaking
The C&O's first chief engineer was Benjamin Wright, formerly chief engineer of the Erie Canal. A groundbreaking ceremony was held on July 4, 1828, attended by U.S. president John Quincy Adams. The ceremony was held near Georgetown, at the canal's eventual  mark near Lock 6, the upstream end of the Little Falls skirting canal, and Dam No. 1.

At the groundbreaking, there was still argument over the eastern end of the canal. The directors thought that Little Falls (at the downstream end of the Patowmack Little Falls Skirting Canal) was sufficient since that literally fulfilled the charter's condition of reaching the tidewater, but people in Washington wanted it to end in Washington, connecting to the Tiber Creek and Anacostia river. For that reason, the canal originally opened from Little Falls to Seneca, and the next year, was extended down to Georgetown.

The first president of the canal, Charles F. Mercer, insisted on perfection since this was a work of national importance. This would cost the company more money to build the canal. During his term, he forbade the use of slackwaters for navigation, the use of composite locks (see section below), or reduction of the cross section of the canal prism in difficult terrain. This reduced maintenance expenditures but increased construction costs. In the end, two slackwaters (Big Slackwater above Dam No. 4, and Little Slackwater above Dam No. 5) and multiple composite locks (Locks 58–71) were built.

At first, the canal company planned to use steamboats in the slackwaters, since without mules, the canal boats had to use oars to move upstream. After much discussion of the dangers of early steamboats, the company provided a towpath so that the mules could pull the boats through the slackwaters.

Section numbers and contracts
A separate construction contract was issued for each section. Locks, culverts, dams, etc. were listed on the contracts by section number, not by mileage as is done today. For instance, Locks 5 and 6 are on Section No. 1, all the way to Guard Lock No. 8 on section 367. Sections A–H were in the Georgetown level below lock 5

First part opened
In November 1830, the canal opened from Little Falls to Seneca. The Georgetown section opened the following year.

Dispute for Point of Rocks; second part opened
In 1828, the C&O Canal and the Baltimore and Ohio Railroad (B&O) began fighting for sole use of the narrow strip of available land along the Potomac River from Point of Rocks to Harpers Ferry. After a Maryland state court battle that involved Daniel Webster and Roger B. Taney, the companies agreed to share the right-of-way.

In August 1829, the canal company began importing indentured laborers to Alexandria and Georgetown. These workers were promised meat three times a day, vegetables, and a "reasonable allowance of whiskey", $8 to $12 per day, $20 for masons. Still, many were dissatisfied with the slave-like conditions. Friction between the largest groups, from Ireland and Germany, meant they had to be kept in different crews.

In 1832, the canal company prohibited liquor in a bid to improve the speed of construction, but soon repealed its ban.

In August or September 1832, an epidemic of cholera swept through the construction camps, killing many workers and leading others to throw down their tools and flee.

By 1833, the canal's Georgetown end was extended  eastward to Tiber Creek, near the western terminus of the Washington City Canal, which extended through the future National Mall to the foot of the United States Capitol. A lock keeper's house at the eastern end of this Washington Branch of the C&O Canal remains at the southwest corner of Constitution Avenue and 17th Street, N.W., at the edge of the National Mall.

In 1834, the section to Harper's Ferry opened and the canal reached Williamsport.

In 1836, the canal was used by canal packets as a Star Route to carry mail from Georgetown to Shepherdstown. The contract was held by Albert Humrickhouse at $1,000 per annum for a daily service of 72 book miles. The canal approached Hancock, Maryland, by 1839.

In March 1837, three surveys were made for a possible link to the northeast to Baltimore: via Westminster, via Monocacy-Linganore, and via Seneca, but they were all were deemed impractical due to lack of water at the summit level.

The Canal reached Dam No. 6 (west of Hancock) in 1839.

As the canal approached Hancock, more construction problems surfaced. Limestone sinkholes and caverns caused the canal bottom to cave in near Shepherdstown, near Two Locks above Dam No. 4, around Four Locks, Big pool, and Roundtop Hill near Dam No. 6. On 6 December 1839, Chief Engineer Fisk wrote, "These breaks have all evidently been occasioned by limestone sinks which exhibit themselves by a falling down of the bottom of the Canal into limestone caverns that are lower than, and extend out under the bed of the river: — in consequence of which the water from the Canal is at first conducted down below the canal bottom perhaps twenty or thirty feet and thence out along under the bed of the river ... It has been a matter of surprise to me that our Canal thus far has suffered so little from limesinks. We may yet however have much trouble from this source near and above the breach at Lock No. 37. For about a mile, there is scarcely a hundred feet in length of the canal in which there are not several small lime sink holes...". He recommended costly but necessary repairs, which were done by 1840.

Since it was difficult to obtain stone for the locks, engineers built composite locks, sometimes of kyanized wood.

In 1843, the Potomac Aqueduct Bridge was built near the present-day Francis Scott Key Bridge to connect the canal to the Alexandria Canal, which led to Alexandria, Virginia.

In April 1843, floods damaged much of the finished portion of the canal between Georgetown and Harpers Ferry, including the Shenandoah river lock. One flood suspended navigation for 103 days. The company raised the embankments around Little Falls, and made a "tumbling waste" near the 4-mile marker.

Last 50 miles

Building the last  segment proved difficult and expensive. Allen Bowie Davis took on the role of management. In Cumberland, Dam No. 8 and Guard Lock No. 8 had begun construction in 1837 and the final locks (70–75) to Cumberland were completed around 1840. That left an  segment in the middle, which would eventually require building the Paw Paw tunnel, digging the deep cut at Oldtown, and building 17 locks.

Near Paw Paw, the engineers had no good solutions. If they followed the river, they would have to cross over to West Virginia to avoid the cliffs, and an agreement with the B&O Railroad specified that the canal would avoid the south side of the river, unless it was a place where the railroad would not need it. So they took the more expensive decision to build a tunnel through the mountain. The initial cost estimate of $33,500 proved far too low. The tunnel was completed for $616,478.65 Among the components of the project, a kiln was built to provide bricks to line the tunnel.

Originally, the company intended to go around Cumberland, behind the town of Wills Creek, but complaints from the citizens and the city caused the board to change their plans, routing the canal through the center of town.

The canal was opened for trade to Cumberland on Thursday, October 10, 1850. On the first day, five canal boats, Southampton, Elizabeth, Ohio, Delaware and Freeman Rawdon loaded with a total of 491 tons of coal, came down from Cumberland. In one day, the C&O carried more coal in the first day of business than the Lehigh Canal for their full year of business in 1820.

Yet in 1850, the B&O Railroad had already been operating in Cumberland for eight years, and the Canal suffered financially. Debt-ridden, the company dropped its plan to continue construction of the next  of the canal into the Ohio Valley. The company long realized (especially with the experience at the Paw Paw tunnel) that construction over the mountains going to Pittsburgh was "wildly unrealistic". Nevertheless, there was a tunnel built to connect with the Pennsylvania canal.

Even though the railroad beat the canal to Cumberland, the canal was not entirely obsolete. It wasn't until the mid-1870s that improved technology, specifically with larger locomotives and air brakes, allowed the railroad to set rates lower than the canal, and thus seal its fate.

Sometime after the canal opened in 1850, a commemorative obelisk was erected near its Georgetown terminus.

Intervening years
The canal deteriorated during the Civil War. In 1869, the company's annual report said, "During the last ten years little or nothing had been done toward repairing and improving lock-houses, culverts, aqueducts, locks, lock-gates and waste weirs of the Company; many of them had become entirely unfit for use and were becoming worthless, rendering it absolutely essential to the requirements of the Company to have them repaired." Still, some improvements were made in the late 1860s, such as replacing Dams No. 4 and 5.

The early 1870s, which Unrau calls the "Golden Years", were particularly profitable. The company repaid some of its bonds. It made many improvements to the canal, including the installation of a telephone system. Yet there were still floods and other problems. By 1872, so many vessels were unfit for navigation that the company required boats to undergo annual inspections and registration. In July 1876, the crew of the Lezan Ragan stayed afloat while loading in Cumberland only by her crew's pumping. She hit some abutments of the locks near Great Falls, and finally sank at the opening Lock 15 (at the head of Widewater).

For a brief period in the 1860s and 1870s, the company attempted to prevent boating on Sundays. But boatmen broke padlocks on the lock gates and turned to violence when confronted. The company gave up trying to enforce the rule.

The trip from Cumberland to Georgetown generally took about seven days. The fastest known time from Georgetown to Cumberland for a light boat was 62 hours, set by Raleigh Bender from Sharpsburg. Dent Shupp made it from Cumberland to Williamsport in 35 hours with 128 tons of coal.

Receivership
Following the disastrous flood of 1889, the canal company entered receivership with court-appointed trustees. The trustees were given the right to repair and operate the canal under continued court oversight. The trustees represented the majority owners of the C&O Canal Company bonds issued in 1844. While the B&O owned the majority of the 1878 bonds, the B&O did not own a majority of the 1844 bonds as of 1890. However, by 1903, the B&O had acquired sufficient bonds to become "a majority holder", the reported reason being "to secure for the Wabash [railroad] system a foothold on the Atlantic seaboard" which had only been incorporated in February 1903.

Over the next decade, and particularly after 1902, boats on the canal shifted from independent operators to company-owned craft. Boats with colorful names (Bertha M. Young or Lezen Ragan) gave way to numbered craft ("Canal Towage Company" with a number) run by a schedule.

Despite the B&O's status as a majority bondholder, the B&O can not be said to have ever owned the C&O. This did not stop the B&O from trying to sell it. In 1936, the B&O attempted to sell part of the canal from Point of Rocks to the District line. This was blocked by the courts which had continued to oversee the C&O trustees with the court saying "It is of course well known that the Baltimore and Ohio Railroad Company is not the owner of the Chesapeake and Ohio Canal." At that time, the court also stated that the canal could not be sold in pieces but only in its entirety.  In 1938, new trustees were appointed by the court to handle the sale under the court's continued oversight.

Tolls and revenue

Tolls were charged for cargo on the canal. In 1851, for instance, the toll rates on the Canal were set as follows:

Tolls varied greatly, and frequently the board adopted new toll rates.

Some boatmen would try to ship in the boats extra cargo not listed on the waybills to avoid tolls. In 1873, for instance, one boat got from Georgetown to Harpers Ferry with 225 hidden sacks of salt before the company found out.

The items transported on the canal varied. In 1845, for instance, before the canal's completion, the shipments were as follows:

Business after 1891

After 1891, the canal principally transported coal, and sometimes West Virginia limestone, wood, lumber, sand, and flour. (Statistics were only kept for coal.) Coal was loaded in the Cumberland basin, which consisted of dumping four carloads of coal into the boat. Some of the coal had to be shoveled by hand into the spaces beneath the cabins. During the loading process, nobody would be on the boat due to the dust, and mules were kept off, in case the boat sank from being loaded. Despite closing windows, dust usually entered the cabins. After loading, the ridge poles would be put, then the hatches over the ridge poles and openings. The crew would scrub down the boat (using water from the canal) to remove the dust, and the boat would be poled to the other side of the basin, where it would be hitched to the mules.

Boatmen came down to lock 5, called "Willard's lock" or "Waybill Lock", whereupon the locktender would sign the waybill, and report it to the office. If they did not get orders at that lock, they waited near the aqueduct bridge in Georgetown, until orders came through. A tugboat on the river would pull the boats to other points, e.g. Navy Yard, Indianhead, Alexandria. Some coal loads were unloaded directly in the Georgetown coal yards, using buckets. Coal was also unloaded onto ocean sailing vessels bound for Massachusetts (which brought ice, and returned with coal), a 4 masted vessel holding about 20 boatloads of coal.

In the last few years, the tonnage and tolls for coal were as follows

One of the more unusual loads was a circus with about 9 people with their equipment, which included a black bear. They were transported from Oldtown, Maryland to Harpers Ferry. The black bear got loose on the journey, and the boatman told them, "You tie that thing good or you're never going to get to Harpers Ferry, for I'm going to leave the boat."

Other loads included furniture (often second hand), pianos, a parlor suites, watermelons, fish (such as shad and herring), as well as transporting items such as flour or molasses to sell to lockkeepers, as some of the lockkeepers in remote areas needed the boats to bring their supplies. Cement from the Round Top Mill above Hancock was also shipped to Georgetown. Some would pole across the river at Dam No. 2 to get wood, cross-ties, bark (used in tanning), and sometimes grain. Other loads, often carried upstream, included 600 empty barrels in a boat, taken to Shepherdstown to load cement, lumber, fertilizer, and general merchandise for stores along the canal, as well as oysters in barrels, complete materials to build a house, ear corn, and even extra mules.

Fines
The company levied fines for infractions, such as traveling without a waybill or destruction of canal property such as lock gates or canal masonry. For instance:

 May 30, 1877, Capt. Thomas Fisher fined $10 (about US$423 in 2012) for passing through lock without waybill
 Oct 22, 1877, R. Cropley's scow, fined $25 for knocking out gate in Lock No. 5 [Brookmont Lock]
 Nov. 12, 1877, Capt. Joseph Little, fined $10 for running into crib at Lock No. 9 [Seven Locks]
 July 4, 1878, Boat John Sherman, fined $62.70 for unloading and raising (note: this was on Independence Day)
 Aug 30, 1878, Steamer Scrivenes, fined $50, Allowing the Bertha M. Young in tow to sink on Level 36 and abandoning her at night without giving notice, causing navigation to be suspended 36 hrs.
 May 5, 1879, Capt. Jacob Hooker fined $40, Running into and breaking gate at Lock No. 40
 Jan 14, 1880, Boat Harry & Ralph, fined $5, Running into gate at Darbey's Lock (Note: this was in winter, when the canal was usually drained for repairs.)
 Jun 12, 1880, G.L. Booth, fined $4.40, for pumping.

Business after 1924
The last known boat to carry coal was Pat Boyer's Boat #5, which returned to Cumberland on November 27, 1923. The only boats recorded to operate in 1924 were five boats that carried sand from Georgetown to Williamsport to construct a power plant.

Flood of 1924
The flood of 1924 caused major damage to the canal. Most of the railroad and canal bridges near Hancock were destroyed, a breach opened in Dam No. 1, and much damage to the banks and masonry of the canal occurred. Although the railroad did some maintenance, ostensibly so that the canal could quickly be restored to operation, mainly the Georgetown level (Dam No. 1 and below) was fixed to supply Georgetown's mills with water for operation. The rest of the canal remained in disrepair.

The boating season lasted only three months in 1924, and after the flood, navigation ceased. Unfortunately, some communities such as Glen Echo and Cumberland already used the canal to dump sewage, and G.L. Nicholson called the canal a "public nuisance" due to the sewage and being a breeding ground for mosquitoes

In 1928–1929, there was some talk of restoring and reopening the canal from Cumberland to Williamsport, but with the onset of the Great Depression, the plans were never realized In April 1929 after some freshet damage, the railroad repaired a break in the towpath, so that they could continue to flush out mosquitoes as demanded by the Maryland board of health.

The boatmen, now unemployed, went to work for railroads, quarries, farms, and some retired. At that date, the only other canal using mules, was the Lehigh Canal, which was soon to close in 1940.

Some of the lockkeepers stayed on, and there were a few canal superintendents were listed for the now disused canal.

Flood of 1936

This winter flood in March 1936 caused even more damage to the abandoned canal, still recovering from the damage caused by the extreme floods just over a decade prior. This flood, caused by the thawing of earlier ice, combined with the flow of heavy rains, led to the highest water mark the Potomac River had ever had thus far, destroying lockhouses, levels, and other structures. There were some efforts at restoration, mainly to the Georgetown level so that the factories could have their water supply. Due to the inattention of the B&O Railroad, the canal became a "magnificent wreck" and would need intense repairs and reconstruction throughout many areas destroyed by the floods.

National Historical Park

In 1938, the abandoned canal was obtained from the bondholders by the United States in exchange for a loan from the federal Reconstruction Finance Corporation, and is now the Chesapeake and Ohio Canal National Historical Park.

Locks and engineering

Canal prism
The dimensions of the canal vary quite a bit. Below Lock 5, the width is 80 feet wide and 6 feet deep. Above Lock 5 to Harper's Ferry it is 60 feet wide and 6 feet deep, and above Harper's Ferry, 50 feet wide.

Lift locks and guard locks

Locks 8–27 and their accompanying lock houses were made from Seneca red sandstone, quarried from the Seneca Quarry, as was Aqueduct No. 1, better known as Seneca Aqueduct. This unique structure is the only aqueduct made from Seneca red sandstone and is doubly unique for being the only aqueduct on the C&O that is also a lock (Lock 24, Riley's Lock).

Seven guard locks, often called inlet locks (numbered 1 through 8) were built to allow water and sometimes boats (particularly at Big Slackwater and Little Slackwater) to enter. Dam #7 and Guard Lock #7 were proposed (near mile 164 at the South Branch of the Potomac) but never built. In 1856, there was a steam pump put at that site. Later, in 1872, a new steam pump was put near mile 174.

Three additional river locks were built, to allow boats to enter the canal at the river, as demanded by the Virginia legislature for buying canal stock. They were at Goose Creek (below Edwards Ferry, Lock 25), near the Shenendoah River just below Lock 33, and at Shepherdstown.

The Goose Creek locks were to allow boats from the Goose Creek and Little River Navigation Company to enter. Only one Goose Creek boat was documented to enter the C&O canal, and there is no documentation of a C&O boat entering Goose Creek. The lock was eventually converted into a waste weir.

The railroad refused to let mules walk on the bridge, and from lack of business, the lock was abandoned. Stones from that lock were used for other purposes.

After the 1889 flood destroyed the nearby dam in Shepherdstown, the raison d'être for the Shepherdstown lock was gone, and so it was filled in.

At night, locktenders were required to remove the cranks and handles from all paddle valves to prevent unauthorized use.

Composite locks

Despite Mercer not wanting any composite locks, due to measures to economize on the last  of construction, and the scarcity of good building stone, Locks 58–71 were constructed as composite locks, whereby the lock masonry is built of rubble and inferior undressed stone. Since that makes a rough surface which damages the boats, the locks were originally lined with wood to protect the boats. This wood sheathing had to be replaced. In time, some of the composite locks were lined with concrete, since the wood kept rotting.

Levels
The stretch of canal between locks is called a level. Canalers called these levels by their lengths; for instance, the longest level was the 14 mile level, which was about 14 miles long, and ran from Lock 50 (at 4 locks) to Lock 51 in Hancock. Some levels had additional nicknames (since some had similar lengths), e.g. "Four Mile Level below Dam 6", "Four Mile Level Big Slackwater", or "Four Mile Level of the Log Wall" (which is between locks 14 and 15, includes Widewater, Anglers, Carderock, Billy Goat Trails B, and C, and the downstream entrance to Trail A, all connect on that level). Levels less than a mile between locks were called short levels. Waste weirs and bypass flumes at the locks helped control the height of water in the levels (see below about waste weirs).

Feeders

There were three streams used as feeders: Rocky Run feeder (section #9, around 7 Locks), Great Falls feeder (section #18) and the Tuscarora feeder (section #78). There was a contemplated feeder at the Monocacy (not built). Of course, the remains of the Potomac Company Little Falls skirting canal was used as a feeder also. Inlet Lock No. 2 is called the Seneca Feeder in historic documents.

The remains of the Tuscarora feeder can still be seen, but it was made redundant by Dam No. 3 and was no longer used.

Slackwater navigation

Despite Charles F. Mercer, two slackwaters were used for navigation: Big Slackwater at Dam No. 4, and Little Slackwater at Dam No. 5. The boats had to navigate despite winds, currents, and debris in the channel. In February 1837, the board of directors discussed using steam power in the slackwater for the boats, but instead decided on a permanent towpath. The towpath for Big Slackwater was completed in 1838 for $31,416.36, and the towpath for Little Slackwater was completed in 1839 for $8,204.40.

Little Slackwater was a tricky place to navigate. Not only did it have a lot of hairpin turns, but also just before Guard Lock No. 5, there was a strip of land in the water called "the pier" (that exists even today): loaded boats going downstream would have to go outside the pier, and unloaded boats on the inside, thus making steering difficult for the loaded boats to get into the lock. If the current was fast in the river it could go as fast as the boat, rendering the tiller useless, and thus, a boat could be almost impossible to steer. One man reported that at the slackwater, they had him sit at the front of the boat with a hatchet in case they had to cut the towline [since it would pull the mules into the river], and had a couple of [wooden] hatches turned upside down, so that they could escape to shore on the hatches. On 1 May 1903, the towline to Boat No. 6 broke, with Captain Keim, Mrs. Keim, their two daughters, and Harry Newkirk aboard. One daughter drowned, another suffered a broken leg, and the captain died later of injuries. The rest (including the mules aboard) survived.

Boatmen reported that it was easier to navigate in the slackwaters than the aqueducts, since there was room for the water to move around the boat. Places like aqueducts, where there was little room for the water to move, were difficult for the mules to pull the boat through.

Waste weirs, spillways, and informal overflows (mule drinks)

To regulate the level of water in the canal prism, waste weirs, informal overflows, and spillways were used.

Waste weirs removed the surges of water from storms or excess when a lock was emptied. Boards could be removed or added to adjust the amount of water in the level. If one had to empty the whole level for winter, repairs, or emergencies, waste weirs often had paddle valves (similar to those found in locks) at the bottom which could be opened to let the water out.

Waste weirs come in several styles. Originally they were made of concrete masonry with boards on top making a bridge with mules to pass over. A possible example of an old-style waste weir (abandoned) is at 39.49 miles, above Lock 26 (Wood's Lock). Most of these old waste weirs were replaced with concrete structures in 1906. Another used to be at Pennyfield lock in 1909–1911.

Spillways are made of concrete, and can be on either side, but if on the towpath side, have a bridge so people (and mules) can cross without getting the feet wet. High water simply flows over the spillway and out of the canal. The longest spillway, near Chain Bridge, is 354 feet long, was made in 1830 (but has been worked on since). Another spillway near Foxhall road at mile 1.51, was made in 1835. The spillway and waste weir at Big Pool was built in the 1840s

An informal overflow or mule drink was a dip in the towpath allowing water to flow over, similar to a spillway, but without the bridge or the concrete construction (hence, were more informal). The canalers called these "mule drinks". There are documented informal overflows at mileage 10.76, 49.70, and 58.08. These usually had a drainage ditch which was riprapped with stone to prevent erosion. Historically the towpath dropped two feet to form this overflow. Due to silting, construction, etc. many of these overflows are now difficult to find. Hahn states that clues to finding these overflows include: a gully without a culvert, a sudden lowering of the towpath, or the signs of riprap on the towpath or the gully itself. Many of these (e.g. the one at Pennyfield lock) were replaced by a waste weir.

Paw Paw tunnel

One of the most impressive engineering features of the canal is the Paw Paw Tunnel, which runs for  under a mountain. Built to save  of construction around the obstacle, the  tunnel used over six million bricks. The tunnel took almost twelve years to build; in the end, the tunnel was only wide enough for single lane traffic. One notorious incident included two captains who refused to budge for several days. The company official threw green cornstalks onto a roaring fire at the upwind portion of the tunnel, smoking the offenders out.

Inclined plane
Engineer William Rich Hutton was instrumental in getting the inclined plane built. Starting in 1875, a canal inclined plane was built  upriver from Georgetown, so that boats whose destination was downriver from Washington could bypass the congestion (and price gouging of independent wharf owners) in Georgetown. Originally the company planned to build a river lock, but then discovered that such a lock occasionally would consume more water than the level could provide. They then planned to make an inclined plane, much like the Morris Canal. The first boat went through in 1876; 1,918 boats used the inclined plane that first year. Usage reports conflict: Hahn reports that was only really used for two years, and sporadically in 1889, yet Skramstad reports that due to flood damage in 1880 to the Rock Creek outlet, any boat until 1889 (when another flood wrecked the canal) going further down the Potomac than Georgetown, had to use the inclined plane. It originally used a turbine to power it (like the Morris Canal) but was later switched to use steam power.

The inclined plane was dismantled after a major flood in 1889 when ownership of the canal transferred to the B&O Railroad, which operated the canal to prevent its right of way (particularly at Point of Rocks) from falling into the hands of the Western Maryland Railway.

Telephone system
In the late 1870s, the Company installed a telephone system, rather than a telegraph as was the railroad practice, for $15,000. Completed in October 1879, it had 43 stations along the canal. It was divided into sections with three switches, placed respectively at Dam No. 4, Dam No. 6, and Wood's Lock (head of 9 Mile level, i.e. Lock 26). It is unknown if there are currently any remains of this system.

Culverts

To carry small streams under the canal, 182 culverts, usually of masonry, were built. For instance, culvert #30 was built in 1835 to carry Muddy Branch under the canal. Unfortunately culverts are prone to collapse due to tree roots growing into the canal prism; in addition, rubbish from floods plug culverts, causing floods and more damage. Some culverts have disappeared or were abandoned, although they still appear in company records.

Aqueducts

Eleven aqueducts carried the canal over rivers and large streams that were too large to run through a culvert.

Canal repairs

The canal hired level walkers to walk the level with a shovel, looking for leaks, and repairing them. Large leaks were reported to the division superintendent, who would send out a crew with a repair scow.

Boatmen said that crabs caused leaks, as did muskrats. The company gave a 25 cent bounty on each muskrat.

Boats on the canal

That would permit boats with cargo up to 130 tons. Wright also suggested for passenger boats, having a draft of 10 inches (not including the keel) pulled by 4 horses at 7 miles per hour.

The following classifications of boats originally defined for the canal were as follows:

 Packet Boats, for passengers
 Freight boats
 Scows, especially work scows for construction and maintenance, as well as ice breaking 
 Gondolas

Rafts were, from time to time, on the canal, as well as launches and canoes. By 1835 (no doubt due to complaints about drifting rafts) the company put rates unfavorably against rafts. Farmers would build watercraft which were to last only one trip (to transport their wares) and then be sold in Georgetown for firewood.

Classifications were to change. In 1851, after the opening of the canal to Cumberland, the company adopted new classes of boats: A, B, C, D, E, and F, depending on dimensions and tonnage as follows:

Later years of Canal trade showed a predominance of coal carrying boats. In 1875, the register lists 283 boats owned by coal companies, and of the 108 other boats, 8 were listed as grain carrying, 1 brick, and 1 limestone carrying boat, with the other 91 being general.

During the declining years, freight boats were generally made in Cumberland. Freight boats in those years had two hulls, with 4 inches between them. There were holes (covered, when not in use) that one could put a pump in to pump out the bilge.

Double boats
In 1875, the Canal Company announced its intention to double the lengths of the locks to allow double boats to pass through the canal, i.e. two boats, one behind the other, which could be towed, reducing freight costs by 50%. The Maryland Coal Company experimented with such boats, but the floods in the late 1870s destroyed these dreams. The first lock to be extended to allow double boats was Edwards Ferry (Lock 25). Locks 25–32 were extended as such, as well as others, for a total of 14 extended locks on the canal.

Traffic regulations
Boats were to keep to the right. Certain craft had preference over others: "boats had the right of way over rafts, descending boats over ascending craft, packets over freight boats at all times, and packets carrying the mail over all others", and later, repair boats actively involved in repair had preference over everybody else. The boat which did not have preference would slow down the mule team, the rope would sink to the bottom of the canal, and the other boat would float over it, and the mules would walk over also. The towline of the one boat would be unhitched so the lines would not tangle, but sometimes they did. There is one report of a towline snagging on the other boat, and the boatman running the boat into the towpath so as not to drag the other mules into the canal.

It was forbidden to moor boats, rafts, or anything on the towpath side of the canal (which would, of course, impede any traffic at night). For that reason, boats would tie up on the berm side for the night.

Due to problems, on April 1, 1851, the company printed a 47-page booklet with new traffic regulations on the canal, detailing every aspect of operation, as well as fines for violations, and were printed in great numbers and distributed to boatmen and company officials.

The typical boating season ran from April until late November or December when the canal froze over. There were some occasions, for instance, during the Civil War, where the company tried to keep the canal open all year round.

Boat repairs

Boats carried oakum and chisels to patch leaks. There were also boat repair areas, for instance, beside Lock 35 and at Lock 47 (Four Locks), to repair boats. The boat would settle on raised beams (at lock 35, they were made of concrete), as the drydock was drained, and the men could make the necessary repairs, using tin and tar. Originally, the canal plans did not have provisions for drydocks or repairs of boats, but by 1838 there were frequent complaints about drifting rafts and wrecks obstructing navigation. The company made provisions for drydocks to help the situation. In the mid-1800s the Canal Company authorized at least 6 drydocks, documented at the following locations: Locks 45–46, Lock 47 (Four Locks), Lock 44 (Shepherdstown), above Lock 14 (near Carderock), Edwards Ferry (Lock 25), and in the rear of Lock 10 (Seven Locks).

Icebreakers
Icebreakers were used on the canal, for instance, at the end of the boating season when winter froze the canal, so that the last group of boats could go home. The icebreaker was typically a company scow filled with pig iron. Mules would pull the boat onto the ice, and the weight would break the ice. During the Civil war, the canal company attempted to keep the canal open during the winters of 1861–1862, despite the fact that winters were usually for repairs. Icebreaker boats were used to keep the channel free of ice, so that the military could move supplies.

Mules

Most boats were drawn by mules. Mules lasted about 15 years. Mules were often changed at locks, over gangplanks. Some boatmen would change teams by making the mules swim to the shore to change teams, leading to mules drowning as a result. Mules were bought, at  years, often from Kentucky, and were broken in by having them drag logs. The command to stop mules was not "whoa" but "ye–yip–ye".

Getting a fully loaded boat moving was not easy for the mules, and overdriving them, especially at the basin in Cumberland where there was no water current to help them move the boat, was common, resulting in many spavined mules. To get a loaded boat going, the mules would have to walk until the line was taut, then put their weight into it, and step once the boat had moved, and repeat this process. Within 25 feet, the boat would be moving.

Mules were shod every other trip in Cumberland, although sometimes they had to be shod every trip. Mules were harnessed, one behind the other, slantwise, which (for some reason) pulled the boat straighter, than if they were abreast.

"Drivers" were the people (often kids) who drove the mules on the towpaths: on the C&O they were not called "muleskinners" nor "hoggees" (the latter term was used on the Erie Canal)

Dogs were useful to a boat captain on the canal to drive mules and also to swim to take the towline to hitch the mules. Joe Sandblower had a dog which would hunt muskrats along the canal, and he would sell the pelts and collect the bounty on muskrats. There is a documented cat on the canal boat, as well as a raccoon.

Horses
Horses were occasionally used to pull boats, but they did not last as long as mules. In the 1900s, a large white horse was used in Cumberland basin like a switching engine, to pull coal cars so that the coal could be loaded into the canal boats.

Steamboats on the canal
 There were occasionally steam boats, one being authorized in 1824. In 1850, the N S Denny company operated some steam driven tugboats on the Canal. The board of directors discussed having steamboats for Big Slackwater, but that was abandoned in favor of a towpath along the side. Records indicate that in the 1879, a single steamboat could go  loaded downstream,  unloaded going upstream, and took 5 to 7 minutes to lock through whether going upstream or downstream (respectively) and used about a ton of coal per day for operation.

Boatmen and boat families
The boatmen (usually with their families) were a rough independent lot, forming a class within themselves, and intermarrying within their own group. They frequently fought amongst each other for any reason, be it racial slurs (real or perceived), precedence at a lock, or for exercise. They fought with lockkeepers over company rules, or even with the company for changes in toll rates. During winter when the boats were tied up, they often lived in their own communities away from others. One boat captain observed that on the canal, women and children were as good as the men, and if it weren't for the children, the canal wouldn't run one day.

On April 2, 1831, Daniel Van Slyke reported:

it is with great difficulty we have been able to preserve order among the boatmen, who in striving to push forward for a preference in passing the several locks are sometimes dis-posed to injure each other's boats as a means of carrying their point. An unfortunate in-stance of this kind happened on Wednesday last at the locks on the 9th section. A strongly constructed boat ran her bow against a gondola loaded with flour, and so much injured her as to render it necessary to transship the load. But no damage was done to the cargo.

One notorious incident occurred in May 1874 when George Reed of the Mayfield and Heison was fined $20 for mooring his boat illegally in the Cumberland Basin. He refused to pay the fine. At Lock 74, he forced his way past the lockkeepers who tried to prevent him from continuing, and he was given an additional fine of $50. He continued (without paying), forced his way through the locks at Harpers Ferry and Lock 5, until Georgetown, where he was served notice for $120 in fees plus $4.08 for the waybill. When he got back to Cumberland, his boat was confiscated until he paid the whole $124.08.

Recklessness among the boatmen was common. Many accidents were due to excessive speed. Aqueduct #3 (Catoctin) had a sharp bend at the upstream end, had been the site of a number of collisions from boatmen going too fast. In July 1855, a freight boat collided with a packet boat which sank. One of the most frequent problems was careless boatmen in their rush to lock through, hitting lock gates.

Many of the men, particularly boat captains, said they knew nothing else [except boating]. One woman said, "The children are brought up on the boat and don't know nothin' else, and that is the only reason they take up 'boating'. Boys work for their fathers until they are big enough to get a boat of their own, and it's always easy to get a boat."

Hours and wages
Fifteen hours a day was the minimum, 18 hours were the most frequently reported, according to the U.S. Department of Labor. Boatman said, "It never rains, snows, or blows for a boatman, and a boatman never has no Sundays." and, "We don't know it's Sunday, till we see some folks along the way, dressed up and a-gin' to Sunday School."

Captains were paid per trip, receiving $70 to $80 per trip in the 1920s, and receiving less than $1,250 per year. Deck hands were paid $12 to $20 per trip, sometimes receiving clothes in lieu of wages or for part of their wages.

The boating season ran from approximately March until December, with the canal drained during winter months to prevent damage from ice and also for repairs.

Women
Women attended to household chores, steered boats, and gave birth on the boats, although if possible, a midwife would be secured if they were near a town. After birth, the journey would resume, with the man handling the chores including cooking. Often if the husband died, the widow would continue managing and operating the boat. Women often served as locktenders also. One mother had 14 children, all born on boats, and never had a physician attending.

Children

The U.S. Department of Labor stated that only the limitations of physical strength prevented the children from performing all operations connected with handling boats. Otho Swain reported he saw a ten-year-old girl put a boat through a lock (i.e. snubbing the boat so it would stop), but that would have been a child who grew up on the canal.

Children generally did the mule driving, except perhaps at night when the captain might do so. In wet weather, the towpath was muddy and slippery and shoes wore out quickly. One man thought himself to be a good father because he provided his boys with rubber boots.

One boatman said, "A boat is a poor place for little children, for all they can do is go in and out of the cabin." His son attended school 94 days out of a possible 178, and the father regretted it, but needed the family to help boat as he could not afford otherwise.

Medical care
For boat families, there was very little medical care. One father stated, "We never need a doctor. We just stay sick until we get well." It was practically impossible to get a doctor in the mountains at the upper end of the canal or on the long levels.

Food

Canned food was sometimes brought. Bean soup, made with beans, ham hocks, and an onion, was common. Other items included corn bread, eggs and bacon, ham, potatoes, and other vegetables. A reported canal custom was the first few rows of corn from farms along the canal could be used by the boatmen. Berries along the towpath were also picked. Molasses also was common. Bread and many groceries could be bought along the canal. Muskrats were sometimes eaten, as well as chickens and ducks either bought or even stolen along the way. Rabbits were snared. Crew members sometimes had a shotgun to shoot rabbits, groundhogs, or other game. Turtles were eaten as well as eels that the locktenders caught in eel pots in the rivers or the bypass flumes. Fish included sunfish, catfish, bigmouth bass, and black bass.

Living quarters
Cabins were 10 feet by 12 feet, and housed two bunks, each 36 inches wide, supposedly for one person, but often occupied by two. While most cabin floors were bare, in one survey, 14 had linoleum covering. The cabins were divided between sleeping quarters and the "stateroom" by a diagonal wall. The feed box, 4 feet by 4 feet, in the center boat, often doubled as sleeping quarters with a blanket thrown over the feed. Occasionally the deck was used for sleeping

Cooking was done on a stove, burning corncobs (from the mule feed) or sometimes coal. Washing clothes and children was typically done at night by moonlight, after tying up the boat, along the side of the canal. Food and provisions for the trip (e.g. flour, sugar, coffee, salt pork, smoked meat, etc.) were bought in Cumberland on Wineow street, from stores such as Coulehan's, Dennis Murphy's, or John McGrinnis's. Some boatmen carried chickens or pigs on the boats. Fish caught in the canal also served as food, as well as turtles. Additional supplies could be bought along the way from lockkeepers and at towns.

Legends and ghosts
Many legends have been documented along the canal during its operating days:

 On the 9 mile level around the 33–34 mile mark, some boats were used to transport soldiers to the Battle of Ball's Bluff during the American Civil War. One of the boats sank, and it was said that departed ghosts of the soldiers haunted the area. Canallers would avoid tying up at night in that area. It was also said that the mules would sense it, and would hurry through the area (it was also called "Haunted House Bend"), and also that there were tales of a ghost dog there.
 There was reported the ghost of an Indian chief on the 14 mile level around Big Pool.
 A lady ghost was reported on the 2 mile level at Catoctin (between locks 28 and 29) which would walk over the waste weir, down the towpath and to the river.
 A headless man was reported to haunt the Paw Paw Tunnel.
 A Romeo and Juliet like-story was documented near Lock 69 (Twigg's lock). (See Locks on the C&O Canal#Lock names for more info).

 A report of "buried treasure" somewhere between Nolands Ferry and the Monocacy river, that could be found if one followed a ghost of a robber, allegedly seen from time to time on moonless nights crossing the Monocacy aqueduct carrying a lantern.

Points of interest

Here is a list of items on the canal, as a canaller traveling by boat from Georgetown to Cumberland would see. (Note: some present day items are on this list also.) A typical canaller would know the canal by the names of the levels and the locks. Most list of points of the canal's points of interest do not contain a list of the levels with their names like we have here. Also note that most lists of locks do not include Guard Locks 4 and 5, which a boat would have to pass through, if navigating the entire canal (It was generally possible for boats to pass through the other guard locks also, but that is if they were going to other destinations, usually on the Virginia/West Virginia side of the river). Also note sometimes there are often slight discrepancies in mileages, for instance NPS and Hahn reports Lock 75 at 175.60 miles, Davies lists "175.35 (175.50)", and Hahn also reports the NPS mile markers are in the wrong place from Milepost 117 to Lock 51, further adding to the confusion. Also note that Some streets in Georgetown were renamed, mostly as numbered streets, pursuant to an 1895 law. See Georgetown street renaming.

Citations

General and cited references 

 This resource survey has a lot of information unavailable elsewhere on the construction and operation of the canal. 

 Butcher, Russell D. (1997). Exploring Our National Historic Parks and Sites. Roberts Rinehart Publishers
 National Park Service. Chesapeake and Ohio Canal National Historical Park. Retrieved 2010-05-11.

Further reading

 Life on the Chesapeake & Ohio Canal, 1859 [York, Pa.: American Canal and Transportation Center, 1975]
 Achenbach, Joel. The Grand Idea: George Washington's Potomac and the Race to the West, Simon and Schuster, 2004.
 Blackford, John, 1771–1839. Ferry Hill Plantation journal: life on the Potomac River and the Chesapeake and Ohio Canal, 4 January 1838-15 January 1839 2d ed. Shepherdstown, W. Va. : [American Canal and Transportation Center], 1975.
 Cotton, Robert. The Chesapeake and Ohio Canal Through the Lens of Sir Robert Cotton
 Fradin, Morris. Hey-ey-ey, lock! Cabin John, Md., See-and-Know Press, 1974
 Gutheim, Frederick. The Potomac. New York: Rinehart and Co., 1949.
 Guzy, Dan. Navigation on the Upper Potomac and Its Tributaries. Western Maryland Regional Library , 2011
 Hahn, Thomas F. The Chesapeake and Ohio Canal Lock-Houses and Lock-Keepers.
 High, Mike. The C&O Canal Companion, Johns Hopkins University Press, 2001.
 Kapsch, Robert and Kapsch, Elizabeth Perry. Monocacy Aqueduct on the Chesapeake and Ohio Canal. Medley Press, 2005.
 Kapsch, Robert. The Potomac Canal, George Washington and the Waterway West.Morgantown, WV: West Virginia University Press, 2007.
 Martin, Edwin. A Beginner's Guide to Wildflowers of the C and O Towpath, 1984.
 Mulligan, Kate. Canal Parks, Museums and Characters of the Mid-Atlantic, Wakefield Press, Washington, DC, 1999.
 Mulligan, Kate. Towns along the Towpath, 1997. (Available from C &O Association) Here is Chapter 3 about Seneca.
 National Park Service, Chesapeake and Ohio Canal National Historical Park Washington, DC: NPS Division of Publications, 1991.
 Rada, James Jr. Canawlers, Legacy Press, 2001.
 Southworth, Scott, et al. Geology of the Chesapeake and Ohio Canal National Historical Park and Potomac River Corridor, District of Columbia, Maryland, West Virginia, and Virginia: U.S. Geological Survey Professional Paper 1691 , 2008.

External links

Official National Park Service Site
Chesapeake and Ohio Canal Company records at the University of Maryland libraries
Jack Rottier photographs and papers of the C and O Canal Online Collection, Special Collections Research Center, Estelle and Melvin Gelman Library, The George Washington University.
C&O Canal Trust
C&O Canal Association
The economic impact of the C&O Canal on canal communities in Washington County, Maryland
Preliminary Guide to the Thomas Hahn Chesapeake and Ohio Canal Collection, 1939-1993, Special Collections Research Center, Estelle and Melvin Gelman Library, The George Washington University
The Chesapeake and Ohio Canal Documentary produced by WETA-TV
C&O Canal is part of the Chesapeake Bay Gateways and Watertrails Network
The Building of the Chesapeake and Ohio Canal - A National Park Service Teaching with Historic Places (TwHP) lesson plan

 
Articles containing video clips
1830 establishments in the United States
Transportation buildings and structures in Allegany County, Maryland
Buildings and structures in Cumberland, Maryland
Transportation buildings and structures in Frederick County, Maryland
Transportation buildings and structures in Montgomery County, Maryland
Transportation buildings and structures in Washington County, Maryland
Canals in Maryland
Canals in Washington, D.C.
Canals opened in 1830
Chesapeake Bay watershed
Cumberland, Maryland
Georgetown (Washington, D.C.)
Hagerstown, Maryland
History of Cumberland, MD-WV MSA
Potomac River watershed
Transportation in Cumberland, MD-WV-PA
Chesapeake and Ohio Canal National Historical Park